Baron St Helens is a title that has been created three times, once in the Peerage of Ireland and twice in the Peerage of the United Kingdom.

History

The first two creations were both in favour of the same person, but are now extinct. The first creation came in the Peerage of Ireland on 26 January 1791 when the Chief Secretary for Ireland Alleyne Fitzherbert was created Baron St Helens. On 31 July 1801 he was further honoured when he was created Baron St Helens, of St Helens on the Isle of Wight in the County of Southampton, in the Peerage of the United Kingdom, allowing him to sit in the House of Lords. On his death in 1839, both baronies became extinct. Lord St Helens was the son of William Fitzherbert, Member of Parliament for Derby, and a younger brother of Sir William Fitzherbert, 1st Baronet.

The third creation came on 31 December 1964 when the Conservative politician Michael Hughes-Young was created  Baron St Helens, of St Helens in the County Palatine of Lancaster. He had earlier represented Wandsworth Central in the House of Commons. It was one of the last hereditary baronies ever created in the Peerage of the United Kingdom.  the title is held by his son, the second Baron, who succeeded in 1980. Henry George Young, father of the first Baron, was a Brigadier-General in the British Army.

Barons St Helens, First and second creations (1791/1801 - 1839)
Alleyne Fitzherbert, 1st Baron St Helens (1753–1839)

Barons St Helens, Third creation (1964 - present)
Michael Henry Colin Hughes-Young, 1st Baron St Helens (1912–1980)
Richard Francis Hughes-Young, 2nd Baron St Helens (born 1945)
The heir apparent, and only heir to the title, is his son, The Hon. Henry Thomas Hughes-Young (born 7 Mar 1986)

References

Kidd, Charles, Williamson, David (editors). Debrett's Peerage and Baronetage (1990 edition). New York: St Martin's Press, 1990.

David Beamish's Peerage Page

Extinct baronies in the Peerage of Ireland
Noble titles created in 1791
Extinct baronies in the Peerage of the United Kingdom
Noble titles created in 1801
Baronies in the Peerage of the United Kingdom
Noble titles created in 1964
Noble titles created for UK MPs